

Events

Pre-1600
41 – Claudius is proclaimed Roman emperor by the Praetorian Guard after they assassinate the previous emperor, his nephew Caligula.
 914 – Start of the First Fatimid invasion of Egypt.
1438 – The Council of Basel suspends Pope Eugene IV.
1458 – Matthias Corvinus is elected King of Hungary.
1536 – King Henry VIII of England suffers an accident while jousting, leading to a brain injury that historians say may have influenced his later erratic behaviour and possible impotence.

1601–1900
1651 – Arauco War: Spanish and Mapuche authorities meet in the Parliament of Boroa renewing the fragile peace established at the parliaments of Quillín in 1641 and 1647. 
1679 – King Charles II of England dissolves the Cavalier Parliament.
1742 – Charles VII Albert becomes Holy Roman Emperor.
1758 – During the Seven Years' War the leading burghers of Königsberg submit to Elizabeth of Russia, thus forming Russian Prussia (until 1763).
1817 – Crossing of the Andes: Many soldiers of Juan Gregorio de las Heras are captured during the action of Picheuta.
1835 – Slaves in Salvador da Bahia, Brazil, stage a revolt, which is instrumental in ending slavery there 50 years later.
1848 – California Gold Rush: James W. Marshall finds gold at Sutter's Mill near Sacramento.
1857 – The University of Calcutta is formally founded as the first fully fledged university in South Asia.
1859 – The United Principalities of Moldavia and Wallachia (later named Romania) is formed as a personal union under the rule of Domnitor Alexandru Ioan Cuza.
1900 – Second Boer War: Boers stop a British attempt to break the Siege of Ladysmith in the Battle of Spion Kop.

1901–present
1908 – The first Boy Scout troop is organized in England by Robert Baden-Powell.
1915 – World War I: British Grand Fleet battle cruisers under Vice-Admiral Sir David Beatty engage Rear-Admiral Franz von Hipper's battle cruisers in the Battle of Dogger Bank.
1916 – In Brushaber v. Union Pacific Railroad Co., the Supreme Court of the United States declares the federal income tax constitutional.
1918 – The Gregorian calendar is introduced in Russia by decree of the Council of People's Commissars effective February 14 (New Style).
1933 – The 20th Amendment to the United States Constitution is ratified, changing the beginning and end of terms for all elected federal offices.
1935 – Gottfried Krueger Brewing Company starts selling the first canned beer.
1939 – The deadliest earthquake in Chilean history strikes Chillán, killing approximately 28,000 people.
1942 – World War II: The Allies bombard Bangkok, leading Thailand, then under Japanese control, to declare war against the United States and United Kingdom.
1943 – World War II: Franklin D. Roosevelt and Winston Churchill conclude a conference in Casablanca.
1946 – The United Nations General Assembly passes its first resolution to establish the United Nations Atomic Energy Commission.
1960 – Algerian War: Some units of European volunteers in Algiers stage an insurrection known as the "barricades week", during which they seize government buildings and clash with local police.
1961 – Goldsboro B-52 crash: A bomber carrying two H-bombs breaks up in mid-air over North Carolina. The uranium core of one weapon remains lost.
1966 – Air India Flight 101 crashes into Mont Blanc.
1968 – Vietnam War: The 1st Australian Task Force launches Operation Coburg against the North Vietnamese Army and Viet Cong during wider fighting around Long Bình and Biên Hòa.
1972 – Japanese Sgt. Shoichi Yokoi is found hiding in a Guam jungle, where he had been since the end of World War II.
1977 – The Atocha massacre occurs in Madrid during the Spanish transition to democracy. 
1978 – Soviet satellite Kosmos 954, with a nuclear reactor on board, burns up in Earth's atmosphere, scattering radioactive debris over Canada's Northwest Territories. Only 1% is recovered.
1984 – Apple Computer places the Macintosh personal computer on sale in the United States.
1986 – The Voyager 2 space probe makes its closest approach to Uranus.
1987 – About 20,000 protestors march in a civil rights demonstration in Forsyth County, Georgia, United States.
1989 – Notorious serial killer Ted Bundy, with over 30 known victims, is executed by the electric chair at the Florida State Prison.
1990 – Japan launches Hiten, the country's first lunar probe, the first robotic lunar probe since the Soviet Union's Luna 24 in 1976, and the first lunar probe launched by a country other than Soviet Union or the United States.
2003 – The United States Department of Homeland Security officially begins operation.
2009 – Cyclone Klaus makes landfall near Bordeaux, France, causing 26 deaths as well as extensive disruptions to public transport and power supplies.
2011 – At least 35 are killed and 180 injured in a bombing at Moscow's Domodedovo Airport.
2018 – Former doctor Larry Nassar is sentenced up to 175 years in prison after being found guilty of using his position to sexually abuse female gymnasts.

Births

Pre-1600
76 – Hadrian, Roman emperor (d. 138)
1287 – Richard de Bury, English bishop and politician, Lord Chancellor of Great Britain (d. 1345)
1444 – Galeazzo Maria Sforza, Duke of Milan (d. 1476)
1547 – Joanna of Austria, Grand Duchess of Tuscany, Austrian Archduchess (d. 1578)

1601–1900
1602 – Mildmay Fane, 2nd Earl of Westmorland, English politician (d. 1666)
1619 – Yamazaki Ansai, Japanese philosopher (d. 1682)
1643 – Charles Sackville, 6th Earl of Dorset, English poet and politician, Lord Chamberlain of Great Britain (d. 1706)
1664 – John Vanbrugh, English architect and dramatist (d. 1726)
1670 – William Congreve, English playwright and poet (d. 1729)
1672 – Margrave Albert Frederick of Brandenburg-Schwedt, German Lieutenant General (d. 1731)
1674 – Thomas Tanner, English bishop (d. 1735)
1679 – Christian Wolff, German philosopher and academic (d. 1754)
1684 – Charles Alexander, Duke of Württemberg, German noble (d. 1737)
1705 – Farinelli, Italian castrato singer (d. 1782)
1709 – Dom Bédos de Celles, French monk and organist (d. 1779)
1712 – Frederick the Great, Prussian king (d. 1786)
1732 – Pierre Beaumarchais, French playwright and financier (d. 1799)
1739 – Jean Nicolas Houchard, French General of the French Revolution (d. 1793)
1746 – Gustav III of Sweden (d. 1792)
1749 – Charles James Fox, English businessman and politician, Secretary of State for Foreign and Commonwealth Affairs (d. 1806)
1754 – Andrew Ellicott, American soldier and surveyor (d. 1820)
1761 – Louis Klein, French general (d. 1845)
1763 – Louis Alexandre Andrault de Langeron, French-Ukrainian general and politician (d. 1831)
1776 – E. T. A. Hoffmann, German jurist, author, and composer (d. 1822)
1787 – Christian Ludwig Brehm, German pastor and ornithologist (d. 1864)
1804 – Delphine de Girardin, French author (d. 1855)
1814 – Duchess Helene of Mecklenburg-Schwerin, French Crown Princess (d. 1858)
  1814   – John Colenso, British mathematician (d. 1883)
1816 – Wilhelm Henzen, German philologist and epigraphist (d. 1887)
1828 – Ferdinand Cohn, German biologist (d. 1898)
1829 – Yechiel Michel Epstein, Rabbi and posek (d. 1908)
1836 – Signe Rink, Greenland-born Danish writer and ethnologist (d. 1909)
1843 – Josip Stadler, Croatian archbishop (d. 1918)
1848 – Vasily Surikov, Russian painter (d. 1916)
1850 – Hermann Ebbinghaus, German psychologist (d. 1909)
1853 – Sigbert Josef Maria Ganser, German psychiatrist (d. 1931)
1856 – Friedrich Grünanger, Transylvanian Hungarian-German architect (d. 1929)
1858 – Constance Naden, English poet and philosopher (d. 1889)
1862 – Edith Wharton, American novelist and short story writer (d. 1937)
1863 – August Adler, Czech and Austrian mathematician (d. 1923)
1864 – Marguerite Durand, French actress, journalist, and activist (d. 1936)
  1864   – Gaetano Giardino, Italian soldier and Marshal of Italy (d. 1935)
1866 – Jaan Poska, Estonian lawyer and politician, 1st Estonian Minister of Foreign Affairs (d. 1920)
1869 – Helena Maud Brown Cobb (d. 1922)
1870 – Herbert Kilpin, English footballer (d. 1916)
1871 – Jiří Karásek ze Lvovic, Czech poet, writer and literary critic (d. 1951)
  1871   – Thomas Jaggar, American volcanologist (d. 1953)
1872 – Yuly Aykhenvald, Russian literary critic (d. 1928)
  1872   – Konstantin Bogaevsky, Russian painter (d. 1943)
  1872   – Morris Travers, English chemist and academic (d. 1961)
1873 – Dmitry Ushakov, Russian philologist and lexicographer (d. 1942)
1882 – Harold D. Babcock, American astronomer (d. 1968)
  1882   – Ödön Bodor, Hungarian athlete (d. 1927)
1886 – Henry King, American actor, director, producer, and screenwriter (d. 1982)
1887 – Jean-Henri Humbert, French botanist (d. 1967)
1888 – Vicki Baum, Austrian author and screenwriter (d. 1960)
  1888   – Ernst Heinkel, German engineer and businessman, founded the Heinkel Aircraft Manufacturing Company (d. 1958)
1889 – Victor Eftimiu, Romanian poet and playwright (d. 1972)
  1889   – Charles Hawes, American historian and author (d. 1923)
  1889   – Hermann-Bernhard Ramcke, German general of paratroop forces during World War II (d. 1968)
1891 – Walter Model, German field marshal (d. 1945)
1892 – Franz Aigner, Austrian weightlifter (d. 1970)
1895 – Eugen Roth, German poet and songwriter (d. 1976)
1897 – Paul Fejos, Hungarian-born American director (d. 1963)
1899 – Hoyt Vandenberg, U.S. Air Force general (d. 1954)
  1900   – René Guillot, French writer (d. 1969)

1901–present
1901 – Harry Calder, South African cricketer (d. 1995)
  1901   – Cassandre, French painter (d. 1968)
  1901   – Edward Turner, English engineer (d. 1973)
1905 – J. Howard Marshall, American lawyer and businessman (d. 1995)
1906 – Wilfred Jackson, American animator and composer (d. 1988)
1907 – Ismail Nasiruddin of Terengganu, fourth Yang di-Pertuan Agong of Malaysia (d. 1979)
  1907   – Maurice Couve de Murville, French soldier and politician, Prime Minister of France (d. 1999)
  1907   – Jean Daetwyler, Swiss composer and musician (d. 1994)
1909 – Martin Lings, English author and scholar (d. 2005)
1910 – Doris Haddock, American political activist (d. 2010)
1912 – Frederick Ashworth, American admiral (d. 2005)
1913 – Norman Dello Joio, American organist and composer (d. 2008)
  1913   – Ray Stehr, Australian rugby league player and coach (d. 1983)
1915 – Vítězslava Kaprálová, Czech composer and conductor (d. 1940)
  1915   – Robert Motherwell, American painter and academic (d. 1991)
1916 – Rafael Caldera, Venezuelan lawyer and politician, 65th President of Venezuela (d. 2009)
  1916   – Gene Mako, Hungarian-American tennis player and actor (d. 2013)
1917 – Ernest Borgnine, American actor (d. 2012)
  1917   – Wilhelmus Demarteau, Dutch prelate of the Roman Catholic Church (d. 2012)
1918 – Gottfried von Einem, Austrian pianist and composer (d. 1996)
  1918   – Oral Roberts, American evangelist, founded Oral Roberts University and Oral Roberts Evangelistic Association (d. 2009)
1919 – Coleman Francis, American actor, director, producer, and screenwriter (d. 1973)
  1919   – Leon Kirchner, American composer and educator (d. 2009)
1920 – Jimmy Forrest, American saxophonist (d. 1980)
  1920   – Jerry Maren, American actor (d. 2018)
1922 – Daniel Boulanger, French actor and screenwriter (d. 2014)
  1922   – Neil Franklin, English footballer (d. 1996)
1924 – Brian Bevan, Australian rugby league player (d. 1991)
1925 – Gus Mortson, Canadian ice hockey player and coach (d. 2015)
  1925   – Maria Tallchief, American ballerina and actress (d. 2013)
1926 – Ruth Asawa, American sculptor (d. 2013)
  1926   – Georges Lautner, French director and screenwriter (d. 2013)
1927 – Paula Hawkins, American politician (d. 2009)
1928 – Desmond Morris, English zoologist, ethologist, and painter
  1928   – Michel Serrault, French actor (d. 2007)
1930 – Terence Bayler, New Zealand actor (d. 2016)
  1930   – Mahmoud Farshchian, Iranian-Persian painter and academic
  1930   – John Romita Sr., American comic book artist
1931 – Lars Hörmander, Swedish mathematician and academic (d. 2012)
  1931   – Ib Nørholm, Danish composer and organist (d. 2019)
1932 – Éliane Radigue, French electronic music composer
1933 – Kamran Baghirov, the 12th First Secretary of Azerbaijan Communist Party (d. 2000)
  1933   – Asim Ferhatović, Bosnian footballer (d. 1987)
1934 – Leonard Goldberg, American producer (d. 2019)
  1934   – Stanisław Grochowiak, Polish poet and dramatist (d. 1976)
1935 – Eric Ashton, English rugby player and coach (d. 2008)
  1935   – Shivabalayogi, Indian religious leader (d. 1994)
1936 – Doug Kershaw, American fiddle player and singer
1937 – Trevor Edwards, Welsh footballer
1938 – Julius Hemphill, American saxophonist and composer (d. 1995)
1939 – Renate Garisch-Culmberger, German shot putter 
  1939   – Ray Stevens, American singer-songwriter and actor
1940 – Vito Acconci, American designer (d. 2017)
  1940   – Joachim Gauck, German pastor and politician, 11th President of Germany
1941 – Neil Diamond, American singer-songwriter and guitarist
  1941   – Aaron Neville, American singer 
  1941   – Dan Shechtman, Israeli chemist and academic, Nobel Prize laureate
1942 – Ingo Friedrich, German Member of the European Parliament
  1942   – Gary Hart, American wrestler and manager (d. 2008)
1943 – Peter Struck, German lawyer and politician, 13th German Federal Minister of Defence (d. 2012)
  1943   – Barry Mealand, English footballer (d. 2013) 
  1943   – Sharon Tate, American model and actress (d. 1969)
  1943   – Tony Trimmer, English race car driver
  1943   – Manuel Velázquez, Spanish footballer (d. 2016)
1944 – David Gerrold, American science fiction screenwriter and author
  1944   – Gian-Franco Kasper, Swiss ski official (d. 2021)
1945 – John Garamendi, American football player and politician, 1st United States Deputy Secretary of the Interior
  1945   – Subhash Ghai, Indian director, producer and screenwriter
  1945   – Eva Janko, Austrian javelin thrower
1946 – Michael Ontkean, Canadian actor
1947 – Giorgio Chinaglia, Italian footballer (d. 2012)
  1947   – Michio Kaku, American physicist and academic
  1947   – Masashi Ozaki, Japanese baseball player and golfer
  1947   – Warren Zevon, American singer-songwriter (d. 2003)
1948 – Michael Des Barres, the 26th Marquis Des Barres, English musician, actor, and DJ
1949 – John Belushi, American actor and screenwriter (d. 1982)
  1949   – Bart Gordon, American lawyer
  1949   – Nadezhda Ilyina, Russian athlete and mother of Russian tennis player Nadia Petrova (d. 2013)
  1949   – Rihoko Yoshida, Japanese voice actress
1950 – Daniel Auteuil, French actor, director, and screenwriter
1951 – Yakov Smirnoff, Ukrainian-American comedian and actor
1953 – Yuri Bashmet, Russian violinist, viola player, and conductor
  1953   – Moon Jae-in, 19th President of South Korea
1954 – Jo Gartner, Austrian race car driver (d. 1986)
1955 – Jim Montgomery, American swimmer
  1955   – Alan Sokal, American physicist and author
  1955   – Lynda Weinman, American businesswoman and author
1956 – Agus Martowardojo, governor of Bank Indonesia
1957 – Mark Eaton, American basketball player and sportscaster (d. 2021)
  1957   – Ade Edmondson, English comedian and musician
1958 – Kim Eui-kon, Korean wrestler
  1958   – Jools Holland, English singer-songwriter and pianist
  1958   – Frank Ullrich, German biathlete
1959 – Akira Maeda, Japanese wrestler, mixed martial artist, and actor
  1959   – Michel Preud'homme, Belgian footballer and manager
1960 – Jack Neo, Singaporean filmmaker, director and actor
1961 – Jorge Barrios, Uruguayan footballer
  1961   – Guido Buchwald, German footballer and manager
  1961   – Christa Kinshofer, German ski racer
  1961   – Nastassja Kinski, German-American actress and producer
  1961   – William Van Dijck, Belgian runner
1963 – Arnold Vanderlyde, Dutch boxer
1965 – Carlos Saldanha, Brazilian-American actor, director, producer, and screenwriter
  1965   – Margaret Urlich, New Zealand singer-songwriter 
  1965   – Pagonis Vakalopoulos, Greek footballer and manager
1966 – Julie Dreyfus, French actress
  1966   – Karin Viard, French actress
1967 – Michael Kiske, German singer
  1967   – Phil LaMarr, American actor and comedian
1968 – Fernando Escartín, Spanish cyclist
  1968   – Antony Garrett Lisi, American theoretical physicist
  1968   – Mary Lou Retton, American gymnast
  1968   – Tymerlan Huseynov, Ukrainian footballer
1969 – Yoo Ho-jeong, South Korean actress
  1969   – Carlos Rômulo Gonçalves e Silva, bishop of Montenegro
1970 – Roberto Bonano, Argentine footballer 
  1970   – Luke Egan, Australian surfer
  1970   – Neil Johnson, Zimbabwean cricketer 
  1970   – Matthew Lillard, American actor
1971 – José Carlos Fernandez, Bolivian footballer
1972 – Beth Hart, American blues-rock singer and piano player
1974 – Cyril Despres, French rally racer
  1974   – Ed Helms, American actor, producer, and screenwriter
  1974   – Melissa Tkautz, Australian actress and singer
  1974   – Rokia Traoré, Malian singer
1975 – Gianluca Basile, Italian former professional basketball player
  1975   – Rónald Gómez, Costa Rican footballer and manager
  1975   – Reto Hug, Swiss triathlete
  1975   – Henna Raita, Finnish alpine skier
1976 – Shae-Lynn Bourne, Canadian ice dancer, coach, and choreographer
  1976   – Cindy Pieters, Belgian cyclist
1977 – Andrija Gerić, Serbian volleyball player
  1977   – Michelle Hunziker, Swiss-Dutch actress, model and singer
1978 – Veerle Baetens, Belgian actress and singer
  1978   – Mark Hildreth, Canadian actor and musician
  1978   – Kristen Schaal, American actress, voice artist, comedian and writer
1979 – Tatyana Ali, American actress and singer
  1979   – Leandro Desábato, Argentinian footballer
  1979   – Busy Signal, Jamaican dancehall reggae artist
  1979   – Nik Wallenda, American acrobat
1980 – Jofre Mateu, Spanish footballer
  1980   – Suzy, Portuguese singer
1981 – Carrie Coon, American actress
  1981   – Mario Eggimann, Swiss footballer
  1981   – Zaur Hashimov, Azerbaijani footballer and manager
  1981   – Elena Kolomina, Kazakhstani cross country skier
1982 – Céline Deville, French footballer
  1982   – Daveed Diggs, American actor, rapper and singer
  1982   – Claudia Heill, Austrian judoka (d. 2011)
  1982   – Aitor Hernández, Spanish racing cyclist
1983 – Davide Biondini, Italian footballer
  1983   – Wyatt Crockett, New Zealand rugby player
  1983   – Evgeny Drattsev, Russian swimmer
  1983   – Craig Horner, Australian actor and musician
  1983   – Shaun Maloney, Scottish footballer
  1983   – Scott Speed, American race car driver
  1984   – Emerse Faé, French-born Ivorian footballer
  1984   – Yotam Halperin, Israeli basketball player
  1984   – Jung Jin-sun, South Korean fencer
  1984   – Scott Kazmir, American baseball player
  1984   – Paulo Sérgio Moreira Gonçalves, Portuguese footballer
1985 – Fabiana Claudino, Brazilian volleyball player
  1985   – Trey Gilder, American basketball player
1986 – Cristiano Araújo, Brazilian singer-songwriter (d. 2015)
  1986   – Mohammad Bagheri Motamed, Iranian taekwondo practitioner
  1986   – Mischa Barton, English-American actress
  1986   – Vladislav Ivanov, Russian footballer
  1986   – Michael Kightly, English footballer
  1986   – Ricky Ullman, Israeli-American actor
  1986   – Sean McVay, American football coach
1987 – Wayne Hennessey, Welsh footballer
  1987   – Luis Suárez, Uruguayan footballer
  1987   – Davide Valsecchi, Italian racing driver
  1987   – Kia Vaughn, American born Czech basketball player
  1987   – Guan Xin, Chinese basketball player
1988 – Selina Jörg, German snowboarder
1989 – Serdar Kesimal, Turkish footballer
  1989   – Gong Lijiao, Chinese shot putter
  1989   – Whit Merrifield, American baseball player
  1989   – Ki Sung-yueng, South Korean footballer
1990 – Mao Abe, Japanese singer-songwriter and guitarist
1991 – Zhan Beleniuk, Ukrainian Greco-Roman wrestler
  1991   – Tatiana Kashirina, Russian weightlifter
  1991   – Zé Luís, Cape Verdean footballer
  1991   – Li Xuerui, Chinese badminton player
1992 – Phiwa Nkambule, South African entrepreneur
  1992   – Felitciano Zschusschen, Curaçao footballer
1994 – Tommie Hoban, English footballer
1995 – Dylan Everett, Canadian actor
1997 – Nirei Fukuzumi, Japanese racer
1999 – Vitalie Damașcan, Moldovan footballer
2003 – Johnny Orlando, Canadian singer and songwriter
2012 – Princess Athena of Denmark, younger child of Prince Joachim and Princess Marie of Denmark

Deaths

Pre-1600
41 – Caligula, Roman emperor (b. 12)
 817 – Pope Stephen IV (b. 770)
 901 – Liu Jishu, general of the Tang Dynasty
1046 – Eckard II, Margrave of Meissen (b. c. 985)
1125 – David IV of Georgia (b. 1073)
1336 – Alfonso IV of Aragon (b. 1299)
1376 – Richard FitzAlan, 10th Earl of Arundel, English commander (b. 1306)
1473 – Conrad Paumann, German organist and composer (b. 1410)
1525 – Franciabigio, Florentine painter (b. 1482)
1595 – Ferdinand II, Archduke of Austria (b. 1529)

1601–1900
1626 – Samuel Argall, English captain and politician, Colonial Governor of Virginia (b. 1572)
1639 – Jörg Jenatsch, Swiss pastor and politician (b. 1596)
1666 – Johann Andreas Herbst, German composer and theorist (b. 1588)
1709 – George Rooke, English admiral and politician (b. 1650)
1877 – Johann Christian Poggendorff, German physicist and journalist (b. 1796)
1881 – James Collinson, English painter (b. 1825)
1883 – Friedrich von Flotow, German composer (b. 1812)
1895 – Lord Randolph Churchill, English lawyer and politician, Chancellor of the Exchequer (b. 1849)

1901–present
1920 – Percy French, Irish songwriter, entertainer and artist (b. 1854)
1920 – Amedeo Modigliani, Italian painter and sculptor (b. 1884)
1939 – Maximilian Bircher-Benner, Swiss physician, created Muesli (b. 1867)
1943 – John Burns, English trade union leader and politician, Secretary of State for Business, Innovation and Skills (b. 1858)
1960 – Edwin Fischer, Swiss pianist and conductor (b. 1886)
1961 – Alfred Carlton Gilbert, American pole vaulter and businessman, founded the A. C. Gilbert Company (b. 1884)
1962 – André Lhote, French sculptor and painter (b. 1885)
  1962   – Stanley Lord, English naval captain (b. 1877)
  1962   – Ahmet Hamdi Tanpınar, Turkish author, poet, and scholar (b. 1901)
1965 – Winston Churchill, English colonel and politician, Prime Minister of the United Kingdom, Nobel Prize laureate (b. 1874)
1966 – Homi J. Bhabha, Indian physicist and academic (b. 1909)
1970 – Caresse Crosby, American fashion designer and publisher, co-founded the Black Sun Press (b. 1891)
1971 – Bill W., American activist, co-founder of Alcoholics Anonymous (b. 1895)
1973 – J. Carrol Naish, American actor (b. 1896)
1975 – Larry Fine, American comedian (b. 1902)
1982 – Alfredo Ovando Candía, Bolivian general and politician, 56th President of Bolivia (b. 1918)
1983 – George Cukor, American director and producer (b. 1899)
1986 – L. Ron Hubbard, American religious leader and author, founded the Church of Scientology (b. 1911)
  1986   – Gordon MacRae, American actor and singer (b. 1921)
1988 – Werner Fenchel, German-Danish mathematician and academic (b. 1905)
1989 – Ted Bundy, American serial killer (b. 1946)
1990 – Madge Bellamy, American actress (b. 1899)
1991 – Jack Schaefer, American journalist and author (b. 1907)
1992 – Ken Darby, American composer and conductor (b. 1909)
1993 – Gustav Ernesaks, Estonian composer and conductor (b. 1908)
  1993   – Thurgood Marshall, American lawyer and jurist, 32nd United States Solicitor General (b. 1908)
  1993   – Uğur Mumcu, Turkish investigative journalist (b. 1942)
2001 – Gaffar Okkan, Turkish police chief (b. 1952)
2002 – Elie Hobeika, Lebanese commander and politician (b. 1956)
2003 – Gianni Agnelli, Italian businessman (b. 1921)
2004 – Leônidas, Brazilian footballer and manager (b. 1913)
2006 – Schafik Handal, Salvadoran politician (b. 1930)
2007 – Krystyna Feldman, Polish actress (b. 1916)
  2007   – İsmail Cem İpekçi, Turkish journalist and politician, 45th Turkish Minister of Foreign Affairs (b. 1940)
  2007   – Guadalupe Larriva, Ecuadorian academic and politician (b. 1956)
  2007   – Emiliano Mercado del Toro, Puerto Rican-American soldier (b. 1891)
  2010   – Pernell Roberts, American actor (b. 1928)
2011 – Bernd Eichinger, German director and producer (b. 1949)
2014 – Shulamit Aloni, Israeli lawyer and politician, 11th Israeli Minister of Education (b. 1928)
  2014   – Rafael Pineda Ponce, Honduran academic and politician (b. 1930)
2015 – Otto Carius, German lieutenant and pharmacist (b. 1922)
2016 – Fredrik Barth, German-Norwegian anthropologist and academic (b. 1928)
  2016   – Marvin Minsky, American computer scientist and academic (b. 1927)
  2016   – Henry Worsley, English colonel and explorer (b. 1960)
2017 – Butch Trucks, American drummer (b. 1947)
2018 – Mark E. Smith, British singer-songwriter (b. 1957)
2019 – Rosemary Bryant Mariner, American United States Naval Aviator (b. 1953)
2008 - Usha Narayanan, Burmese-born First Lady of India (b. 1922)

Holidays and observances
Christian feast day:
Babylas of Antioch
Cadoc (Wales)
Exuperantius of Cingoli
Felician of Foligno
Francis de Sales
Pratulin Martyrs (Greek Catholic Church)
January 24 (Eastern Orthodox liturgics)
Day of the Unification of the Romanian Principalities (Romania)
Feast of Our Lady of Peace (Roman Catholic Church), and its related observances:
Feria de Alasitas (La Paz)
Uttar Pradesh Day (Uttar Pradesh, India)
National Girl Child Day (India)

References

External links

 BBC: On This Day
 
 Historical Events on January 24

Days of the year
January